Jammihal is a village in Dharwad district of Karnataka, India.

Demographics 
As of the 2011 Census of India there were 164 households in Jammihal and a total population of 950 consisting of 513 males and 437 females. There were 141 children ages 0-6.

References

Villages in Dharwad district